The State Anthem of the Armenian SSR was the national anthem of Armenia when it was a republic of the Soviet Union and known as the Armenian Soviet Socialist Republic. It was used between 1944 and 1991. Its music was composed by Armenian composer Aram Khachaturian, and the lyrics were written by Sarmen. Along with the Anthem of the Estonian SSR, it is one of the only two SSR anthems without an intro.

Upon independence from the Soviet Union in 1991, Armenia adopted the anthem "Mer Hayrenik" in its place, though there has been occasional debate about restoring the music of the anthem of the Armenian SSR with different lyrics as the national anthem.

Lyrics

1956–1991 Version

1944–1956 Version

Restoration attempts
The anthem has always maintained simultaneous public support and displeasure in Armenia, and there have been attempts to restore the anthem's melody with new lyrics as the national anthem of the Republic of Armenia, similar to the case with Russia's in 2000 during the early years of Vladimir Putin's presidency. Some Armenian composers and artists have long disliked the uncomplicated theme of the current national anthem, "Mer Hayrenik", and have expressed a desire for a more solemn tune, while others have stated that singing "Mer Hayrenik" itself has carried too much sorrow throughout the 20th and 21st centuries and that a more joyous alternative should be chosen. In 2019, National Assembly vice-speaker Alen Simonyan claimed that most Armenians do not like the current anthem. Eurasianet reported in 2019 that the current anthem remains unpopular with many Armenians, mainly for aesthetic reasons.

In 2005, the issue of changing the national anthem was discussed in government, which culminated in a constitutional referendum on adopting new state symbols within one year (by 6 December 2006). In early 2006, a competition for a new anthem was held by Minister of Culture Hasmik Poghosyan. The competition received 85 entries, and in August the commission shortlisted five, which did not include "Mer Hayrenik" but included a proposal with the music of the anthem of the Armenian SSR and lyrics by Armen Soghomonyan. This proposal won the competition, but the commission members rejected the submitted lyrics, urging local authors to submit better ones. While several Armenian music and arts figures were indifferent to or supportive of the change to the music, the results of the competition were eventually scrapped in October, after strong opposition from the Armenian Revolutionary Federation (or "Dashnaks"), then a member of the ruling coalition, throughout over the selection of a Soviet-era song. The government instead adopted a draft law that would keep "Mer Hayrenik" as the anthem for at least one more year. The adoption of the law was after the 6 December 2006 date set late the year prior as the constitutional deadline for reaffirming the existing state symbol.

In 2012, actor Sos Sargsyan, writer Levon Ananyan and publicist Zori Balayan sent an open letter with 2,208 signatures to the president, petitioning to restore the Soviet-era coat of arms designed by painter Martiros Saryan and the anthem composed by Aram Khachaturyan. Ananyan stated, "... this is an issue that’s always important and has to always be raised, it’s the face of our country, our symbols that have to be representative and impressive." Political historian Shushan Khatlamajyan, the widow of the painter who restored Armenia's current coat of arms, opposed the restoration of the anthem, stating that people were trying to return "symbols of a period when they had a good life" and attributed Russia's Soviet-era anthem restoration to "pro-empire aspirations", stating, "... what do we want to achieve by trying to bring back fragments from our past?" while director of the Martin Saryan House-Museum Ruzan Saryan, Martin's granddaughter, supported it, stating, "... viewing the masterpieces by Saryan and Khachaturyan through the prism of ‘totalitarian past’ is medieval prejudice.”

In 2015, Chairman of the Composers' Union of Armenia Aram Satyan criticised the current Armenian anthem's sad impression and stated that the tone of the music should rise and become upbeat in the process. He stated, "In the case of other nations’ anthems we see some grandeur as it rises to the space, and ours on the contrary is directed to the earth… We can restore Aram Khachaturian’s music or use the Hayastan song composed by Gabriel Yeranyan in 2012."

In 2018, the House-Museum of Aram Khachaturian proposed for the national anthem to be changed to one based on the music of that of the Armenian SSR, composed by Khachaturian. This petition was not supported at the time in Armenia, which was dealing with the 2018 Armenian protests and revolution.

In 2019, another suggestion to adopt a national anthem based on the music of the anthem of the Armenian SSR was put forward by vice-speaker of the National Assembly Alen Simonyan. In a Facebook post, he stated that it is "a powerful anthem that meets all the requirements." His comment received support from composer Ara Gevorgyan, who replied, "It is a great hymn and we look forward to the decision to restore it." Simonyan subsequently created a Facebook poll, in which two-thirds of more than 6,500 respondents voted in favour of the change. Minister of Diaspora Babken Ter-Grigoryan responded by stating that he would survey the Armenian diaspora on the potential change. With Armenia's new parliament under Nikol Pashinyan seated just three weeks prior, many among the Armenian public responded by saying it was not a pressing issue at the time. A member of the Armenian Revolutionary Federation again expressed strong opposition to the idea.

Proposed text

Notes

References

External links
 Instrumental recording in MP3 format (Short version)
 Original version (1946–1956) (Vocal) (archive link)

Armenian SSR
Armenian music
National symbols of Armenia
Compositions by Aram Khachaturian
Armenian Soviet Socialist Republic